Tiddas is the second studio album by Australian three-piece folk group Tiddas. The album was released in August 1996 and peaked at number 36 on the ARIA Charts.

At the ARIA Music Awards of 1997, the album was nominated for nominations ARIA Award for Best Indigenous Release.

Track listing

Charts

Release history

References

1996 albums
Tiddas (band) albums
Albums produced by Joe Camilleri